Carabus hispanus is a species of beetle in family Carabidae native to southwestern France, with the Massif Central as the northern boundary of its distribution range.

External links
Carabus hispanus at Fauna Europaea

hispanus
Beetles of Europe
Beetles described in 1787